This is a list of personal computer games compatible with FreeTrack by interface.

FreeTrack interface
 ARMA: Armed Assault - [Yaw, Pitch, X, Z]
 ARMA 2 - [Yaw, Pitch, X, Z]
 ARMA 2: Operation Arrowhead - [Yaw, Pitch, X, Z]
 ARMA 3 - [Yaw, Pitch, X, Y, Z]
 Assetto Corsa - [Yaw, Pitch, X, Y, Z]
 DayZ Standalone - [Yaw, Pitch, X, Y, Z]
 Dirt Rally - [Yaw, Pitch, Roll, X, Y, Z]
 Elite: Dangerous - [Yaw, Pitch, Roll, X, Y, Z]
 Euro Truck Simulator 2 - [Yaw, Pitch,  X, Y, Z]
 GP Bikes  - [Yaw, Pitch]
 Iron Front: Liberation 1944 - [Yaw, Pitch, X, Z]   
 Kart Racing PRO - [Yaw, Pitch]
 Miscreated - [Yaw, Pitch, Roll, X, Y, Z]
 Microsoft Flight Simulator (2020) [Yaw, Pitch, Roll, X, Y, Z]
 Take On Helicopters - [Yaw, Pitch, Roll, X, Y, Z]
 World Racing Series - [Yaw, Pitch]
 X3: Albion Prelude - [Yaw, Pitch, Roll]

With third-party support
 Battlefield 2 - [Yaw, Pitch, Roll, X, Y, Z] - BF2FreeLook
 DCS: A-10C - [Yaw, Pitch, Roll, X, Y, Z] - FreeTrack compatible headtracker.dll plugin
 DCS: Black Shark 2 - [Yaw, Pitch, Roll, X, Y, Z] - FreeTrack compatible headtracker.dll plugin
 DCS: World - [Yaw, Pitch, Roll, X, Y, Z] - FreeTrack compatible headtracker.dll plugin
 Kerbal Space Program - [Yaw, Pitch, Roll, X, Y, Z] - FreeTrack compatible plugin
 Unity game engine - [Yaw, Pitch, Roll, X, Y, Z] - Unity Package
 X-Plane 9/10 - [Yaw, Pitch, Roll, X, Y, Z] - ft2xplane

FSUIPC

 Flight Simulator 2002 -  [Yaw, Pitch, Z]
 Flight Simulator 2004: A Century of Flight -  [Yaw, Pitch, Z]

SimConnect

 ESP - [Yaw, Pitch, Roll, X, Y, Z]
 Flight Simulator X - [Yaw, Pitch, Roll, X, Y, Z]
 Flight Simulator 2020 - [Yaw, Pitch, Roll, X, Y, Z]
 Prepar3D - [Yaw, Pitch, Roll, X, Y, Z]

TrackIR interface
All TrackIR Enhanced games, along with the following special cases:

Require TIRViews.dll file, distributed with TrackIR software
 Colin McRae Rally
 Combat Flight Simulator 3: Battle for Europe
 F1 Challenge '99-'02
 Flight Simulator 2004
 Flight Simulator X
 JetPakNG (Flight Simulator 2004 mod)
 LunarPilot (Flight Simulator 2004 mod)
 Mediterranean Air War (Combat Flight Simulator 3 mod)
 NASCAR Racing 2003 Season
 Over Flanders Fields (Combat Flight Simulator 3 mod)
 Richard Burns Rally
 TOCA Race Driver 2
 Wings of War
 War Thunder

Encrypted interface and compatible only after using TrackIRFixer
 DCS: Black Shark
 LOMAC: Flaming Cliffs 2
 DCS: A-10C
 DCS: Black Shark 2
 DCS: World
 Iron Front: Liberation 1944 
 Microsoft Flight
 Operation Flashpoint: Dragon Rising
 Operation Flashpoint: Red River
 Tom Clancy's H.A.W.X
 Tom Clancy's H.A.W.X 2
 DiRT 2
 DiRT 3
 F1 2010
 F1 2011
 F1 2012
 Take On Helicopters
 theHunter

With third-party support

By ToCA EDIT:

 Need for Speed: Hot Pursuit (2010)
 Need for Speed: Shift 
 Need For Speed: Most Wanted (2012)
 Need for Speed: The Run
 Ridge Racer Unbounded
 Shift 2: Unleashed
 Sleeping Dogs
 Test Drive Unlimited 2
 WRC: FIA World Rally Championship
 WRC 3: FIA World Rally Championship

By JSJ:

 Grand Prix Legends
 Kuju Rail Simulator (RailWorks)
 RailWorks 2
 RailWorks 4: Train Simulator 2013

References

External links
Official list of TrackIR Enhanced games
List of FreeTrack compatible games

F